"Too Many Puppies" is a song by the American rock band Primus, released as the second single from their debut studio album Frizzle Fry (1990). It was the first Primus song bassist and lead singer Les Claypool ever composed. A reworked version featuring drummer Bryan "Brain" Mantia can be found on their Rhinoplasty EP (1998).

Lyrics
The song is mostly about the band's reflection on war, and how many soldiers are too young to go off to war, parodying the idea of "the dogs of war" by claiming the dogs are merely puppies. The song was written six years prior to the first Persian Gulf War (despite being released in 1990) and was possibly about violence happening around the region during that time period, such as the Soviet–Afghan War or Iran–Iraq War.

Music video
A video was in production for "Too Many Puppies", but the project was canceled when Primus was signed to Interscope Records. The video had been a rarity until 2003, when it was released on Animals Should Not Try to Act Like People. The music video features a man who, after shaving his head, acts weird with army material (such as an army helmet, a pair of boots, and a rifle) and a woman in makeup (presumably his mother) and milk, all in accordance with the song's lyrics; interspersed are shots of the band playing live in front of a rowdy crowd.

Live
Primus first played the song in 1987, and it has been regularly played in their live shows ever since. Occasionally, when playing the song live, Les Claypool plays teases of various cover songs, such as the opening riff of Metallica's "Master of Puppets", as a bridge before the final verse.

Reception
AllMusic writer Ned Raggett thought it was one of the best songs on Frizzle Fry.

AXS ranked "Too Many Puppies" the third best Primus song.

See also
 List of anti-war songs

References

Anti-war songs
Primus (band) songs
1990 singles
1990 songs
Songs written by Les Claypool
Songs written by Larry LaLonde
Songs written by Tim Alexander
Caroline Records singles
Music videos directed by Kevin Kerslake